Goessel USD 411 is a public unified school district headquartered in Goessel, Kansas, United States.  The district includes the community of Goessel, and nearby rural areas of Marion / McPherson / Harvey Counties.

History
In 1945, the School Reorganization Act in Kansas caused the consolidation of thousands of rural school districts in Kansas.  In 1963, the School Unification Act in Kansas caused the further consolidatation of thousands of tiny school districts into hundreds of larger Unified School Districts.

Current schools
The school district operates the following schools:
 Goessel High School at 100 East Main Street in Goessel.
 Goessel Junior High School at 100 East Main Street in Goessel.
 Goessel Elementary School at 500 East Main Street in Goessel.

Closed schools
 TBD

See also
 Kansas State Department of Education
 Kansas State High School Activities Association
 List of high schools in Kansas
 List of unified school districts in Kansas

References

Further reading

External links
 

School districts in Kansas
Education in Marion County, Kansas